Longifolene synthase (EC 4.2.3.58) is an enzyme with systematic name (2E,6E)-farnesyl-diphosphate diphosphate-lyase (longifolene-forming). This enzyme catalyses the following chemical reaction

 (2E,6E)-farnesyl diphosphate  longifolene + diphosphate

This enzyme forms α-longipinene, longicyclene and traces of other sesquiterpenoids.

References

External links 
 

EC 4.2.3